J17 may refer to:

Vehicles

Locomotives 
 GSR Class J17, an Irish steam locomotive
 LNER Class J17, a British steam locomotive class

Ships 
 , a Halcyon-class minesweeper of the Royal Navy
 , a Sandhayak-class survey ship of the Indian Navy

Other uses 
 County Route J17 (California)
 Gyroelongated square bipyramid, a Johnson solid (J17)
 Just Seventeen, a British magazine
 Small nucleolar RNA snR60/Z15/Z230/Z193/J17
 Pneumonia